The  is a commuter railway line in Japan owned by private railway operator Tokyu Corporation. It runs between Tamagawa and Kamata in southwest Tokyo, entirely within Ōta ward. The operator's name, Tōkyū, is included in the formal name of this line.

It was formed in 2000 from the western portion of the Tōkyū Mekama Line, which was then rerouted west of Tamagawa (former Tamagawa-en) station and renamed the Meguro Line.

This line should not be confused with the Tokyu Shin-Tamagawa Line (a section of track from Shibuya to Futako-Tamagawa, (which has since been absorbed into the Tokyu Den-en-Toshi Line), or the Tamagawa Line tramway which preceded that (of which one of its branches now forms the Setagaya Line).

Station list

All stations are located in Ota.

Rolling stock
All the rolling stock is shared with Tokyu Ikegami Line.

Current
 1000 series 3-car sets (since 1990)
 7000 series 3-car sets (since 2007)

Former
 7600 series 3-car sets (until 2015)
 7700 series 3-car sets (until 2018)

History
The Tokyu Tamagawa Line was formed on 6 August 2000 with the splitting of the former Tokyu Mekama Line. Wanman driver-only operation also commenced on the line from this date.

Future plans
This would provide an interchange between the lines, improving accessibility to Tokyo's Haneda Airport ahead of the 2020 Summer Olympics. The plans never materialized in time for the 2020 Summer Olympics. However , Ōta Ward has agreed with the Tokyo Metropolitan Government to pay 70% of the project cost of  while having the city government responsible for the remaining 30%.

References

External links

 Tokyu Corporation website 

Lines of Tokyu Corporation
Railway lines in Tokyo
1067 mm gauge railways in Japan